The 2018 Nippon Professional Baseball season was the 69th season since the NPB was reorganized in 1950.

Regular season standings

Interleague results
Current as of 25 September 2018

Interleague results are placed in order of current regular season standings. The 'I' column indicates the teams' interleague position.

The interleague results are indicative only of the teams playing ability against those teams in the opposing league, and have no bearing on the placings or Climax Series'. The sponsor, Nippon Life, does hand out awards to players and teams based on their finishing in the Interleague standings, however.

Climax Series

First stage

Central League

Pacific League

Final stage

Central League

Pacific League

Japan Series

League leaders

Central League

Pacific League

See also
2018 KBO League season
2018 Major League Baseball season

References

 
2018 in baseball
2018 in Japanese sport